The Port of Brunswick is an Atlantic seaport located in Brunswick, Georgia, United States, in the southeast corner of the state. It is one of four ports operated by the Georgia Ports Authority.

The Port of Brunswick is one of the nation's most productive ports on the Atlantic coast. The shrimping industry is still important economically; the city was once called The Shrimp Capital of the World due to the plentiful wild shrimp (also known as Georgia White Shrimp) harvested in its local sounds and along local beaches and sandbar sloughs.

Imported products include wood pulp, paper products, wheat, soybeans, and heavy machinery. Brunswick is the primary U.S. port of automobile imports for manufacturers Jaguar, Land Rover, Porsche, Mitsubishi and Volvo.

Ford, GM and Mercedes export vehicles through Port of Brunswick. Other exports include agricultural products such as barley malt, corn and oats; other bulk cargo includes cement, gypsum, limestone, perlite, salt and sand.

History
In 1789, President George Washington proclaimed Brunswick as one of the five original ports of entry for the Thirteen Colonies.

During the American Civil War, the city prospered.

In World War II, 99 Liberty ships were built for the Merchant Marine.

During the war years, the traditional Blessing of the Fleet in Brunswick was begun.

Facilities

The Port of Brunswick includes three GPA-owned deep-water terminals, two of which are directly operated by the GPA.

 Colonel's Island Terminal: Owned and operated by the GPA, the facility has three berths and three on-terminal auto processors. The facility also handles break-bulk and project cargo.
 Mayor's Point Terminal specializes in break-bulk and project cargo, in particular the handling forest products. The  facility features 1,200 feet (366 m) of deepwater berthing, approximately 355,000 square feet (33,000 m2) of covered storage and 7.9 acres (32,100 m2) of open, versatile storage. 
 East River Terminal and Lanier Dock, operated by Logistec U.S.A., specializes in the handling of break-bulk and bulk commodities. The  facility features 1,600 feet (488 m) of deepwater berthing, approximately 688,000 square feet (64,000 m2) of covered storage and 15 acres (61,000 m2) of open, versatile storage.

References

External links
International Auto Processing website

Brunswick
Buildings and structures in Glynn County, Georgia
Brunswick, Georgia
Transportation in Glynn County, Georgia